Library Trends is a quarterly peer-reviewed academic journal founded in 1952 and published quarterly by the Johns Hopkins University Press. It covers international developments and future directions in the fields of library and information science. It includes analysis of research and writing, critical opinion, and reviews. Each issue is devoted to a single topic of interest.

Library Trends is available electronically via EBSCO, Academic OneFile (Gale), WilsonWeb (Wilson Library Literature & Information Science Full Text), IDEALS, and Project MUSE.

References

External links 
 

Publications established in 1952
Library science journals
Johns Hopkins University Press academic journals
English-language journals
Quarterly journals
Magazines published in Illinois